Khorsing Engti (born December 1948) is an Indian politician from the state of Assam. He is a former Member of Assam Legislative Assembly for Howraghat and Minister in the Tarun Gogoi cabinet.

References 

Assam MLAs 2006–2011
Assam MLAs 1985–1991
Assam MLAs 2011–2016
Assam politicians
1948 births
Living people
Indian National Congress politicians from Assam